Margaret MacDiarmid is a Canadian politician, former provincial Minister of Health, and also served as Minister of Labour, Citizens' Services and Open Government. She was elected as a Liberal Member of the Legislative Assembly of British Columbia in the 2009 provincial election, representing the riding of Vancouver-Fairview. She previously served as Minister of Education, Minister of Tourism, Trade and Investment and Minister Responsible for the Intergovernmental Relations Secretariat.

In 2009, then Minister of Education Margaret MacDiarmid was rushed to Peace Arch Hospital for emergency treatment and transferred to Royal Columbian Hospital for intensive care for pneumococcal meningitis. MacDiarmid recovered and was later appointed Minister of Health in 2012 by Premier Christy Clark.

In 2012, Mike de Jong's Ministry of Health fired seven health ministry workers without cause, Margaret MacDiarmid as his freshly appointed replacement falsely claimed that the RCMP were investigating what she referred to as their misconduct.

Later, after one worker committed suicide, others sued, none were charged, some got cash settlements and their jobs back, and the premier apologized, it came to light that the RCMP, for lack of evidence, had never launched any investigation. The matter, in its entirety was referred to the Ombudsperson of British Columbia, who, in 2017, issued a report titled "MISFIRE: The 2012 Ministry Of Health Employment Terminations and Related Matters". The Ombudsperson recommended that by May 31, 2017, government of British Columbia "make a public statement that acknowledges and apologizes for the harm caused by the Ministry of Health investigations and the decisions".

She was defeated in the 2013 provincial election by New Democrat candidate George Heyman.

In 2013, she was appointed to the board of directors for Vancouver Coastal Health Authority. Her appointment lasted until 2017

Electoral results 

|-

|NDP
|Jenn McGinn
|align="right"|5,752
|align="right"|46.98
|align="right"|
|align="right"|$70,030

|-

|}

References

External links
Legislative Assembly web site
personal web site

British Columbia Liberal Party MLAs
Women government ministers of Canada
Education ministers of British Columbia
Members of the Executive Council of British Columbia
Women MLAs in British Columbia
Politicians from Vancouver
Living people
Health ministers of British Columbia
21st-century Canadian politicians
21st-century Canadian women politicians
Year of birth missing (living people)